Max Bolkart (born 29 July 1932 in Oberstdorf, Bavaria) is a West German former ski jumper who competed from 1954 to 1966.

Career
He finished fourth in the individual large hill at the 1956 Winter Olympics in Cortina d'Ampezzo and sixth in the same event at the 1960 Winter Olympics in Squaw Valley.

Bolkart is best known as being the winner of the Four Hills Tournament in 1959-60 when he won three of the four events (Oberstdorf, Garmisch-Partenkirchen, and Innsbruck) while finishing fifth in the last event at Bischofshofen. Those three victories were the only one in his career.

Invalid ski jumping world record

 Not recognized! Crashed at world record distance.

References

External links

1932 births
Living people
People from Oberstdorf
Sportspeople from Swabia (Bavaria)
Olympic ski jumpers of the United Team of Germany
Ski jumpers at the 1956 Winter Olympics
Ski jumpers at the 1960 Winter Olympics
German male ski jumpers
Recipients of the Cross of the Order of Merit of the Federal Republic of Germany
Ski jumpers at the 1964 Winter Olympics